The  Basilica of St. Stanislaus is a Roman Catholic minor basilica dedicated to Stanislaus of Szczepanów located in Chicopee, Massachusetts.  The church is under the circumscription of the Roman Catholic Diocese of Springfield in Massachusetts and serves St. Stanislaus Bishop & Martyr's Parish.  The church was completed in 1908 to the designs of Robert J. Reiley and Gustave E. Steinback of the firm Reiley and Steinback.  The basilica was decreed on June 25, 1991.

References

External links
 Parish website
 The Catholic Photographer photo collection

Roman Catholic churches in Chicopee, Massachusetts
Stanislaus, Basilica of St.
Polish-American culture in Massachusetts
Roman Catholic churches completed in 1908
Gustave E. Steinback church buildings
Robert J. Reiley church buildings
1908 establishments in Massachusetts
20th-century Roman Catholic church buildings in the United States